The Kwakiutl District Council, also spelled Kwakwewlth District Council and Kwakiuth District Council, pronounced Kwagiulth District Council, is a First Nations Tribal Council based on Vancouver Island in British Columbia, Canada, based in the community of Campbell River, British Columbia in the northern Strait of Georgia but including member nations spanning northern Vancouver Island as far as Quatsino Sound.    The nations represented within the Kwakiutl District Council are all Kwakwaka'wakw (speakers of Kwak'wala).

Treaty groups within the Kwakiutl District Council

The Quatsino First Nation, Tlatlasikwala Nation, Da'naxda'xw Awaetlatla Nation, and Gwa'Sala-'Nakwaxda'xw Nation are members of the Winalagalis Treaty Group.

The Kwiakah First Nation, Wei Wai Kai (Cape Mudge First Nation) and Wei Wai Kum (Campbell River First Nation) are members of the Laich-Kwil-Tach Treaty Group.

The Kwakiutl First Nation of Fort Rupert is not in the treaty process at present.

Member governments
 Campbell River First Nation (see Wei Wai Kum and Laich-kwil-tach, also spelled Ligwitlda'xw or Legwildok or Lekwiltok; this name includes both WeiWeiKum and WeiWaiKai Nations; historically their name has been rendered as the Euclataws or Yucultas)
 Cape Mudge First Nation (see Wei Wai Kai and Laich-kwil-tach, also spelled Ligwitlda'xw and this name includes both WeiWeiKum and WeiWaiKai Nations)
 Kwiakah First Nation, also spelled Kwix̌a, another subgroup of the Laich-kwil-tach
 K'ómoks First Nation aka Comox Indian Band
 Da'naxda'xw Awaetlatla Nation
 Gwa'Sala-'Nakwaxda'xw Nation
 Kwakiutl First Nation
 Mamalilikulla-Qwe'Qwa'Sot'Em First Nation
 Quatsino First Nation
 Tlatlasikwala Nation

See also
 List of tribal councils in British Columbia

References

External links
 Kwakiutl District Council 

Campbell River, British Columbia
First Nations tribal councils in British Columbia
Kwakwaka'wakw governments